Fennel is a species of plant, Foeniculum vulgare

Fennel may also refer to:

Plants
Fennel, Foeniculum vulgare, a flowering plant species in the carrot family
Giant fennel, Ferula communis, a flowering plant species in the carrot family
Crithmum, also known as sea fennel, a genus of flowering plant with the sole species Crithmum maritimum, also known as samphire
Nigella sativa, sometimes called "fennel flower", an annual flowering plant in the family Ranunculaceae, native to south and southwest Asia
Caraway, also known as "meridian fennel", (Carum carvi),  a biennial plant in the family Apiaceae, native to western Asia, Europe, and North Africa
Dog fennel, which may refer to a number of species
False fennel, which may refer to a number of species
Giant Tangier fennel, Ferula tingitana, is a species of the Apiaceae genus Ferula
Marsh hog's fennel, Peucedanum palustre ("milk-parsley"), a biennial plant in the family Apiaceae
Hog's-fennel, Peucedanum officinale,  a herbaceous perennial plant in the family Apiaceae found mainly in Central Europe and Southern Europe
Fennel pondweed, Stuckenia pectinata, a cosmopolitan water plant species that grows in fresh and brackish water
Giant hog fennel, Peucedanum verticillare, also known as Milk Parsley, a herbaceous plant in the genus Peucedanum of the family Apiaceae

People
Esther Fennel, (1981-), a German former racing cyclist
Katja Fennel,  an oceanographer
Wallace Fennel, fictional character from the Veronica Mars TV series

Other
Operation Fennel, a contingency organisation for disruption of traffic across the English Channel
HMCS Fennel, a Flower-class corvette that served with the Royal Canadian Navy during the Second World War
 Fennel, a programming language similar to Lisp; see

See also
Fennelly, a family name
Fennell, a family name
Fenella  (disambiguation), a female name